The sports club Yükseliş Sports Club (Yükseliş SK) is a professional men's and women’s, young and PW ice hockey teams from Ankara, Turkey, the men participate in the Turkish Ice Hockey First League (TIHFL) and the women in the Turkish Ice Hockey Women's League, Turkish Young's Ice Hockey League and Turkish PW Ice Hockey Tournament. The teams play out of the Ankara Ice Palace. The colors orange navy and white.

History
Yükseliş Sports Club was founded in 2007. Play-off matches in the 2011–2012 season, Yükseliş Sports Club was third in Turkey.

References

Ice hockey teams in Turkey
Sports teams in Ankara
Ice hockey clubs established in 2007
2007 establishments in Turkey
Turkish Ice Hockey Women's League teams